Lieutenant Colonel Dhan Singh Thapa Magar, PVC (10 April 19286 September 2005) was an Indian Army officer, and recipient of the Param Vir Chakra, India's highest military decoration. Thapa Magar was commissioned into the 1st Battalion, 8 Gorkha Rifles in 1949.

The Sino-Indian War began in October 1962; on 21October, the Chinese advanced to north of Pangong Lake with the objective of capturing Sirijap and Yula. Srijap 1 was a post established on the northern bank of Pangong Lake by the 1st Battalion of 8 Gorkha Rifles and commanded by Major Dhan Singh Thapa Magar Soon the post was surrounded by better armed Chinese forces. Major Thapa Magar and his men held the post and repelled three attacks before eventually being overrun. The survivors, including Thapa Magar, were taken as prisoners of war. For his gallant actions and his efforts to motivate his men under fire he was awarded the Param Vir Chakra.

Thapa Magar was released from captivity after the war ended. Following retirement from the Army, he worked for a brief period with Sahara Airlines. He died on 6September 2005.

Early life
Dhan Singh Thapa  was born to Padam Singh Thapa Magar ( Magar) on 10 April 1928, in Shimla, Himachal Pradesh. He joined the 1st Battalion, 8 Gorkha Rifles on 28August 1949, and received a temporary commission as a second lieutenant on 21 February 1951, with promotion to lieutenant on 21 February 1953. He received a permanent commission as a lieutenant on 29 September 1956, and was promoted captain on 21 February 1957.

Military career

1962 Sino-Indian War

There had been long disagreement between India and China over disputed borders in the Himalaya region. To counter the increasing Chinese intrusions into disputed territory, then Prime Minister of India Jawaharlal Nehru approved a plan called the "Forward Policy", which called for the establishment of a number of small posts facing the Chinese.

On the night of 19–20October 1962, they attacked the eastern sector of the Indian defences. The same night they assaulted and overran the posts at Galwan, Chip Chap, and Pangong areas of Ladakh. On 21October, they advanced to north of Pangong Lake, with the objective of capturing Sirijap and Yula.

Battle at Srijap

The post Srijap1 was established on the northern bank of Pangong lake by the 1st Battalion, 8 Gorkha Rifles. It was part of the series of posts created to the implement the "Forward Policy". The post was strategically important for the defence of Chusul airfield. As there were a number of other posts to be established, only 28 men of Dcompany were present to hold Srijap1. Meanwhile, the Chinese set up three posts around it.

On 19 October 1962, with the arrival of heavy infantry troops, the strength of Chinese forces around Srijap1 witnessed a drastic increase. This caused Major Thapa to anticipate an attack; he ordered his troops to "dig fast and dig deep". As expected, the Chinese launched their first attack with artillery and mortar fire at 4:30am on 20October. This lasted for two-and-a-half hours providing good cover for their infantry, who moved towards the post. By the time shelling ended, around 600 Chinese troops had closed to within  of the rear of the post. On the sight of the Chinese, the Gorkhas immediately started firing with light machine guns (LMG) and rifles, killing a large number of Chinese. The attack broke up  from the post. The Chinese artillery caused many casualties on the Indian side. It also destroyed the communications of DCompany with the rest of the battalion.

Major Thapa, with his second-in-command, Subedar Min Bahadur Gurung, continuously moved from place to place adjusting the defences and boosting the soldiers' morale. To smoke out the Indians the Chinese started attacking the post with incendiary bombs. The Gorkhas countered with hand grenades and small arms fire. Subedar Gurung, who was manning a LMG, was buried when a bunker collapsed on top him. He pulled himself out of the debris and recommenced LMG fire, inflicting heavy casualties among the Chinese until being eventually killed.

By then, the post only had seven men left, with Major Thapa still holding the command. The next Chinese wave came in with heavy machine guns and rocket launchers At this point, the post was also attacked from the lake-side by amphibious craft, each armed with a heavy machine gun. In the meantime two storm boats which had been sent by battalion headquarters to find out the status of Srijap 1 reached the location. Both the boats were fired upon by the Chinese. One of the boats sank, and the other was badly damaged. All the occupants of the first boat died, but the second boat with Naik Rabilal Thapa managed to escape.

By that time, after a third Chinese attack, by tanks, the post was left with only three men. A bomb fell into Major Thapa's bunker, but he managed to escape the fire and came out. Though ammunition was exhausted, Thapa jumped into the trenches and killed many intruders in hand-to-hand combat before he was overpowered and taken prisoner. At battalion headquarters Naik Thapa reported that Srijap1 had fallen with no survivors. Unbeknownst to him, the last three survivors had been taken prisoner. Of these, Rifleman Tulsi Ram Thapa managed to escape the Chinese and rejoined the battalion. It was not known until much later that Major Thapa had been taken prisoner by the Chinese.

Prisoner of War
Major Thapa was treated poorly as a prisoner of war. Against military convention he was forced to undergo a series of punishments: firstly for killing Chinese troops; and secondly for refusing to make statements against the Indian Army and the Indian government. He was released after the war ended in November 1962.

Param Vir Chakra

For his gallantry actions on 20 October 1962, Major Thapa was awarded the Param Vir Chakra. The award citation read:

Later life
Thapa was promoted to the substantive rank of major on 21 February 1964, and to lieutenant-colonel on 28 February 1970. He retired from the Army on 30 April 1980. Post-retirement, Thapa settled down in Lucknow, and served for a brief period as a director with Sahara Airlines. On 6September 2005, Thapa died. He was survived by his wife, Shukla Thapa, and three children.

Other honours
In 1980s, the Shipping Corporation of India (SCI), a Government of India enterprise under the aegis of the Ministry of Shipping, named fifteen of its crude oil tankers in honour of the PVC recipients. The tanker MT Major Dhan Singh Thapa, PVC was delivered to SCI in 1984, and served for 25 years before being phased out.

Notes
Footnotes

Citations

References

Further reading

1928 births
2005 deaths
Indian Army officers
Recipients of the Param Vir Chakra
People from Shimla
Military personnel from Himachal Pradesh